The Benton Review is a weekly newspaper serving Benton, Jasper, Newton, Tippecanoe, Warren and White counties in Indiana.  It began July 1875 as the Benton Democrat; by 1902 it was bought by George Roby as the Benton Review, and he combined it with the Fowler Leader in 1914. The paper's masthead describes it as a combination of the Fowler Leader (founded 1893 by John P. Carr) and the Fowler Republican.

Circulation
Between 1900 and 1905, the Benton Review printed between 1335 and 1540 copies. The Leader claimed over 1000 copies for the same period, and the Republican claimed over 1000 copies for 1903, but these claims could not be verified by Printers' Ink.

References

Further reading 
Geo. P. Rowell & Co. Geo. P. Rowell & Co's American Newspaper Directory, 1877. New York. UNT Digital Library. Geo. P. Rowell & Co's American Newspaper Directory, 1877. Accessed June 22, 2016.

Newspapers published in Indiana
Benton County, Indiana